According to the National Amusement Park Historical Association, there are approximately 1,000 defunct amusement parks in North America, with a significant number being in the United States. The primary reasons for amusement park closures in the early-20th century included the advent of the Great Depression, destruction by fire, incidents, and construction of highways and other forms of land development.

List of parks

Alabama

Arizona

Arkansas

California

Colorado

Connecticut

Delaware

District of Columbia

Florida

Georgia

Idaho

Illinois

Indiana

Iowa

Kansas

Kentucky

Louisiana

Maryland

Massachusetts

Michigan

Minnesota

Mississippi

Missouri

Montana

Nebraska

Nevada

New Hampshire

New Jersey

New Mexico

New York

North Carolina

Ohio

Oklahoma

Oregon

Pennsylvania

Rhode Island

South Carolina

South Dakota

Tennessee

Texas

Utah

Virginia

Washington

West Virginia

Wisconsin

References

 List
amusement parks United States
Defunct United States